The following radio stations broadcast on AM frequency 1490 kHz: 1490 AM is a Regional (Class B) outside the coterminous 48 United States (Alaska, Hawaii, Puerto Rico & U.S. Virgin Islands), and a Local (Class C) frequency within the contiguous 48 states.

Argentina
 LV22 in Huinca Renanco, Cordoba.
 Radio Gama in Buenos Aires.

Canada

Mexico
 XECJC-AM in Ciudad Juárez, Chihuahua
 XEYTM-AM in Teocelo, Veracruz

United States

References

Lists of radio stations by frequency